Janomima ibandana is a moth in the family Eupterotidae. It was described by Ugo Dall'Asta in 1979. It is found in the Democratic Republic of Congo.

References

Moths described in 1979
Eupterotinae
Endemic fauna of the Democratic Republic of the Congo